Wallace Henry Smith  (March 13, 1888 – June 10, 1930) was an infielder in Major League Baseball from 1911 to 1914. He was later the player/manager of the St. Joseph Saints in the Western League in 1922 and 1923.

Sources

Baseball players from Pennsylvania
1888 births
1930 deaths
Major League Baseball infielders
St. Louis Cardinals players
Washington Senators (1901–1960) players
Minor league baseball managers
Vancouver Beavers players
Atlanta Crackers players
Minneapolis Millers (baseball) players
Salt Lake City Bees players
St. Joseph Saints players
Sioux City Packers players